This is a list of German football transfers in the summer transfer window 2017 by club. Only transfers of the Bundesliga, and 2. Bundesliga are included.

Bundesliga

Note: Flags indicate national team as has been defined under FIFA eligibility rules. Players may hold more than one non-FIFA nationality.

FC Bayern Munich

In:

Out:

RB Leipzig

In:                                       

Out:

Borussia Dortmund

In:

Out:

1899 Hoffenheim

In:

Out:

1. FC Köln

In:

Out:

Hertha BSC

In:

Out:

SC Freiburg

In:

Out:

Werder Bremen

In:

Out:

Borussia Mönchengladbach

In:

Out:

FC Schalke 04

In:

Out:

Eintracht Frankfurt

In:

Out:

Bayer 04 Leverkusen

In:

Out:

FC Augsburg

In:

Out:

Hamburger SV

In:

Out:

1. FSV Mainz 05

In:

Out:

VfL Wolfsburg

In:

Out:

VfB Stuttgart

In:

Out:

Hannover 96

In:

Out:

2. Bundesliga

FC Ingolstadt 04

In:

Out:

SV Darmstadt 98

In:

Out:

Eintracht Braunschweig

In:

Out:

1. FC Union Berlin

In:

Out:

Dynamo Dresden

In:

Out:

1. FC Heidenheim

In:

Out:

FC St. Pauli

In:

Out:

SpVgg Greuther Fürth

In:

Out:

VfL Bochum

In:

Out:

SV Sandhausen

In:

Out:

Fortuna Düsseldorf

In:

Out:

1. FC Nürnberg

In:

Out:

1. FC Kaiserslautern

In:

Out:

Erzgebirge Aue

In:

Out:

Arminia Bielefeld

In:

Out:

MSV Duisburg

In:

Out:

Holstein Kiel

In:

Out:

Jahn Regensburg

In:

Out:

See also
 2017–18 Bundesliga
 2017–18 2. Bundesliga

References

External links
 Official site of the DFB 
 Kicker.de 
 Official site of the Bundesliga 
 Official site of the Bundesliga

Football transfers summer 2017
Trans
2017